Chattooga may refer to:

Chattooga County, Georgia
Chattooga River, a designated National Wild and Scenic River in North Carolina
Chattooga River (Alabama-Georgia), flowing from northwest Georgia into Alabama

See also
 Chattanooga (disambiguation)